The Law Adviser to the Lord Lieutenant of Ireland was a Law Officer of the English Crown in nineteenth-century Ireland. The office lapsed in the 1880s, due apparently to concerns that it was becoming too political, but was briefly revived in the early twentieth century. It was abolished on the establishment of the Irish Free State in 1922.

The office was created in 1831 to ease the heavy workload of the existing Irish Law Officers, the Attorney General for Ireland and the Solicitor General for Ireland.

Role of the Law Adviser

No specific duties were assigned to the Law Adviser when the office was created: he acted simply as a general assistant to the senior  Law Officers. Later he was given the tasks of drafting Parliamentary bills relating to Ireland, and of advising lay magistrates on any legal problems which they referred to him. Cases involving State security also fell under his remit: Denis Caulfield Heron, the Law Adviser in 1867, was heavily occupied in prosecuting the trials which followed the Fenian Rising.

At first, the Law Adviser was usually chosen from among the Serjeants-at-law, but in time the position was opened up to rising junior barristers, many of whom hoped in due course to be appointed to the Bench. Later it was decided that the offices of Serjeant and Law Adviser should be separate. There may have been a feeling that some of the work of the Law Adviser was beneath the dignity of the holder of the ancient and prestigious office of Serjeant. However, the Law Adviser might still hope to be appointed a Serjeant at a later date, as James Robinson was. Some holders of the office had a very brief tenure: Jonathan Christian resigned after a few months because the work was interfering with his private practice, and Robinson after a similarly brief time resigned to become Chairman of Quarter Sessions. The appointment could be "non-political": Richard Wilson  Greene, the first Law Adviser, was seen as an opponent of the Government which appointed him.

The Attorney General normally had the final word in the appointment of the Law Adviser: certainly, this was so in 1841 when Francis Blackburne AG insisted on the appointment of Abraham Brewster as Adviser, despite strong opposition from Daniel O'Connell, who disliked Brewster. Blackburne said that he would not tolerate a refusal to ratify the appointment, an interesting glimpse of the influence he wielded in the Dublin administration at the time.

The Law Adviser's function of advising magistrates on points of law was open to criticism as an interference by the Crown with the independence of the judiciary. In particular John Naish, the last nineteenth-century Law Adviser, was attacked by his political opponents for assisting magistrates in suppressing the Irish National Land League. He was criticised in particular for advising that they should use a fourteenth century statute, the Justices of the Peace Act 1361, to imprison those who could not find surety for their good behaviour. Since the statute had clearly been intended only to deal with cases of riot, this was a misreading of the law.

End of the Office of Law Adviser

Perhaps because of the controversy over Naish's advice to magistrates on dealing with the Land League, the office was left vacant after his promotion to the office of  Solicitor General for Ireland in December  1883. Earlier the same year, a Government spokesman had revealed in the House of Commons that the  Government itself had doubts about the Law Adviser's role in advising magistrates, and it is likely that this led to a comprehensive review of the role of, and need for the Law Adviser, which led in turn to his position being left vacant.  In 1876 the Government confirmed that "there  were no plans" to appoint another  Law Adviser.

The office was briefly revived in 1919, but lapsed a year later, and was finally abolished by the Irish Free State in 1924.

List of Law Advisers 1831-1883,1919-1920
incomplete

1831  Richard Wilson Greene
1841  Abraham Brewster
1850  Jonathan Christian
1852  Edmund Hayes
1858  James Anthony Lawson
1859  James Robinson
1859  Andrew Vance
1861  Sir Edward Sullivan, 1st Baronet
1865  Charles Robert Barry
1866  Denis Caulfield Heron
1868  David Plunket, 1st Baron Rathmore
1868  Hugh Law
1874  George Augustus Chichester May
1875  Sir Frederick Falkiner
1876  Gerald FitzGibbon
1879  John Monroe
1880  John Naish

The office was vacant 1883-1919

1919  William Wylie

The office lapsed in 1920 and was abolished in 1924

References

Political office-holders in pre-partition Ireland